The Rubettes are an English pop/glam rock band put together in 1974 after the release of "Sugar Baby Love", a recording assembled of studio session musicians in 1973 by the songwriting team of Wayne Bickerton, the then head of A&R at Polydor Records, and his co-songwriter, Tony Waddington, after their doo-wop and 1950s American pop-influenced songs had been rejected by a number of existing acts. Waddington paired the group with manager John Morris, the husband of singer Clodagh Rodgers and under his guidance, the band duly emerged at the tail end of the glam rock movement, wearing trademark white suits and cloth caps on stage. Their first release, "Sugar Baby Love" was an instant hit remaining at number one in the United Kingdom for four weeks in May 1974, while reaching number 37 on the US chart that August, and remains their best-known record. Subsequent releases were to be less successful, but the band continued to tour well into the 2000s with two line-ups in existence.

History

Classic era (1974–1980)
The Rubettes' first and biggest hit was "Sugar Baby Love" (1974) which was a number one in the United Kingdom, going on to sell around 500,000 copies in the UK and three million copies globally. With three more songs, "Sugar Baby Love" was recorded for Polydor in October 1973 at Lansdowne Studios in Holland Park, London, by a group of session musicians featuring the distinctive falsetto and lead vocals of Paul Da Vinci (born: Paul Leonard Prewer). However, Da Vinci did not join the others to become a member of the band put together by John Richardson, and instead pursued solo work, having signed a contract with Penny Farthing Records. "Sugar Baby Love" was their only UK No. 1 and sole US Top 40 entry. In November 1974, NME music magazine reported that The Rubettes, The Glitter Band and Mud were among the UK bands who had roles in a new film titled Never Too Young to Rock.

The Rubettes, namely Alan Williams (whose vocals never appeared on the original 1973 recording of "Sugar Baby Love", but would front the group in 1974 and sing lead on all remaining songs), John Richardson, Pete Arnesen, Tony Thorpe, Mick Clarke and Bill Hurd, went on to have a number of other top ten hits across Europe during the mid-1970s, such as "Tonight", "Juke Box Jive" and "I Can Do It" sung by Alan Williams, mostly written by the Bickerton–Waddington songwriting team. The Rubettes' success encouraged Bickerton and Waddington to set up State Records, so that ten months after the release of "Sugar Baby Love", the fourth Rubettes single "I Can Do It" was on State (catalogue reference STAT 1). Two smaller hits, "Foe Dee Oh Dee" which made the Top 20 and "Little Darling", which unusually made the BBC Top 30 for only one week, followed on State records also sung by frontman Alan Williams.

In 1976 the band abandoned glam nostalgia to enter more serious territory. "Under One Roof" (1976) sung by John Richardson was a portrayal of a gay man disowned and later murdered by his father; along with Rod Stewart's "The Killing of Georgie" (1976), it was one of the few songs that tackled the topic of homophobia. Their most successful self-composed hit was the country rock styled ballad "Baby I Know" (1977) sung by Tony Thorpe, which reached number 10 in the UK and Germany in 1977.  During this period the band continued to cater for the much bigger European market by continuing to release the more commercial pop singles all featuring lead vocals by Alan Williams  such as "Julia" (1976), "Allez Oop" (1976), and "Ooh La La" (1977). The band became a quintet in early 1975 with the departure of Arnesen, and later became a quartet in mid-1976 when Hurd departed the band; to this day the original band has never expanded its line-up beyond four members. Whilst the band continued as a four-piece; Hurd joined Suzi Quatro's band, touring and playing on a number of worldwide hits, which included the Top 20 success "She's in Love with You" in 1979, before re-joining the Rubettes in 1982.

In another attempt to get away from the 'doo-wop' glam image, Thorpe insisted that the trademark vocal harmonies were left off of his composition, "You're the Reason Why". Gerry Shury and the band out-voted him. The version with no vocal backing has been available as a bootleg recording in certain parts of Europe. In 1979, Thorpe and the band separated over musical differences. Thorpe can be heard on lead vocals on the last Still Unwinding track, "Does It Gotta Be Rock 'N' Roll". His guitar parts and backing vocals remained. After Thorpe's departure, the group's success began to dwindle. The band replaced Thorpe with Bob Benham; but he departed shortly thereafter and the band dissolved in 1980.

Reformation (1982–1999)
The band reformed in 1982, with a line-up consisting of Williams, Clark, Hurd, and drummer Alex Bines to exploit the German market for 1970s nostalgia. This line-up remained relatively stable until 1999, with the only line-up changes being the departure of Clark in 1987, to be replaced first by Steve Kinch and then by Trevor Holliday, before he returned to the fold in 1993. In 1994, the group's profile was raised by the inclusion of "Sugar Baby Love" in the hit movie Muriel's Wedding. This song was also featured in the 2005 Neil Jordan film Breakfast on Pluto soundtrack, and in a Safe Sex commercial.

Separate projects (2000–present)
In 2002, the group hit the headlines once more when, following an acrimonious split and legal action, the Rubettes became the latest in a long line of bands (including the Beach Boys and Spandau Ballet) to end up in the courts in a dispute over ownership of the band's name.  The court ruled that both Williams and Hurd could tour as the Rubettes, as long as it was clear which member was fronting the band.

All was well until 2005 when Williams and Hurd were back in court following an appearance by Hurd's band on the German television station ZDF, with Williams claiming Hurd had breached the terms of the original agreement. On 2 February 2006, a High Court judge found that Hurd and Williams had both been guilty of breaching the 2002 agreement. Costs of the trial were, however, awarded to Williams in view of the severity of Hurd's breaches. Hurd appealed against this decision, but on 3 November 2006 the Appeal Court in London ruled against him, awarding the costs of the appeal to Williams. Hurd has since gone bankrupt.

On 28 March 2008, "Sugar Baby Love" was declared to be the most successful oldie of all time by the German television station RTL.

In March 2012, Thorpe digitally released the No Hits, No Jazz Collection and performed at Darwen Library Theatre with a live eight-piece band for his '50th Anniversary 1-Gig-Tour'. It featured session musicians Iain Reddy, Liam Barber, Justin Randall and Greg Harper. "You're the Reason Why" was played.

The Rubettes featuring Alan Williams
In 2000, Williams formed his version of the band along with Clarke, Richardson, and ex-Kinks keyboardist Mark Haley.

In May and June 2008, The Rubettes were part of the 'Glitz Blitz & 70s Hitz' tour of the UK alongside Sweet and Showaddywaddy.

On 21 September 2014, as part of the Rubettes' 40th anniversary, it was announced that Alan Williams, John Richardson and Mick Clarke would return to the Olympia in Paris, the same venue at which the Rubettes made their first appearance in France in 1974 when "Sugar Baby Love" topped the French and European charts.

In early 2015, this version of The Rubettes underwent their first line-up change when Mark Haley departed the band and was replaced by Steve Etherington.

On 15 April 2016, at 'Theatre Severn' in Shrewsbury, UK they embarked on their first ever solo theatre tour with 40 dates throughout the UK. then continuing on to the 'Arena Loire', Angers, France on 4 November 2016 the first of 60 appearances at major 'Zenith' venues in France and Belgium as part of the 'Age Tendre, Tournée des Idoles' Tour, cumulating at the 'Forest National' in Brussels, Belgium's biggest venue, on 17 February 2017. Their latest compilation album 'La Légende Continue' (CLCD003) was released to coincide with the tour 31 November 2016.

The band broke up in February 2019.  A new Rubettes was formed with the original members John Richardson, Mick Clarke and Steve Etherington (producer/arranger since 1995).

The Rubettes featuring Bill Hurd
Following the dissolution of the original band; Hurd formed his version of the group with longtime drummer Alex Bines, vocalist Paul Da Vinci (who had performed lead vocal on "Sugar Baby Love"), bassist Billy Hill, and guitarist Rufus Rufell. Da Vinci departed the band in 2006 and was replaced by George Bird, and guitarist Rufell leaving in 2009 and replace by Ian Pearce.

In June 2009, Bill Hurd's Rubettes played at the East Kilbride ArtBurst Festival.

In 2010, Bill Hurd's Rubettes covered the 1997 Thorpe composition "Where the Angels Fear to Tread" on their album 21st Century Rock 'n' Roll on Angel Air Records.

2013 saw the beginning of the most turbulent period in the band's history, as line-up instability was common for the next two years. First Bines, Hill, and Pearce all left the band to be replaced by Paul Callaby (drums), Ray Frost (guitars), and John Sorrell (bass) respectively; leaving Hurd as the last remaining 'founding member' of his version of the group left in the band. Late 2013 saw Bird depart the band to be replaced by Yvan Silva. By mid-2013 the band underwent a major personnel upheaval again, as everyone other than Hurd departed the band. The line-up then solidified with the arrival of vocalist Ken Butler, drummer Martin Clapson, and guitarist Dave Harding; with Mike Steed joining them on bass (on loan from The Marmalade) for a few months. The current line-up was completed in late 2014 with the departure of Steed and the arrival of Chris Staines in the bassist role. The band line up has remained fairly settled since 2014 with the only changes following the death of Ken Butler in 2018 saw the appointment of John Summerton (ex Flintlock) on guitar and vocals, and the arrival of drummer Damian Fisher.

The Rubettes featuring John Mick & Steve 
Founding members John Richardson, Mick Clarke, and Steve Etherington decided to break away from Alan Williams, and formed the Rubettes featuring John, Mick, and Steve on 15 February 2019.

The band signed with Sobel Nation Records (distributed by Warner Brothers) and released a single on 20 June 2019 entitled "Ya Lovin' Rocks".

The band has their own radio station playing only music from John Richardson, Mick Clarke, and Steve Etherington. "Jukebox Jive Radio" is a licensed radio station located on the official website for the Rubettes ft. John, Mick & Steve at www.therealrubettes.com.

2022 High Court ownership ruling 
In July 2022 Alan Williams and his company won a High Court trial for the ownership of The Rubettes name, against Mick Clarke, John Richardson and Steve Etherington. Sitting in the High Court in London, Judge Pat Treacy ruled for Williams and said: "The defendants' conduct amounts to a misrepresentation sufficient to engage the tort of passing off. The claimants have succeeded."

Personnel

Current members

The Rubettes featuring Alan Williams (2000–Present)
Alan Williams (born Alan James Williams, 22 December 1948, Welwyn Garden City, Hertfordshire) – guitars, vocals (1974–1980, 1982–1999, 2000–present)
John Richardson (born John George Richardson, 3 May 1947, South Ockendon, Essex) – drums, vocals (2000-2019)
Mick Clarke (born Michael William Clarke, 10 August 1946, Grimsby, Lincolnshire) – bass, vocals (2000-2019)
Mark Haley – keyboards, guitars, vocals (2000–2016)  Glyn Davies guitar vocals Spencer Lingwood drums vocals Lawrence Haley  bass vocals
Steve Etherington – keyboards, guitars, vocals (2016–2019)

The Rubettes featuring John, Mick, & Steve (February 2019)
John Richardson (born John George Richardson, 3 May 1947, South Ockendon, Essex) – drums, vocals (February 2019 – present)
Mick Clarke (born Michael William Clarke, 10 August 1946, Grimsby, Lincolnshire) – bass, vocals (February 2019 – present)
Steve Etherington – keyboards, guitars, vocals (February 2019 – present)

The Rubettes featuring Bill Hurd (2000–present)
Bill Hurd (born William Frederick George Hurd, 11 August 1947, East Ham, East London) – keyboards, vocals (1974–1976, 1982–1999, 2000–present)
John Summerton – guitar, vocals (2018–present)
Damian Fisher – drums, vocals (2017-2018, 2020–present)
Dave Harding – guitar, vocals (2014–present)
Chris Staines – bass, vocals (2015-2017, 2019–present)

Former members

The Rubettes (1973–1980, 1982–1999)
Pete Arnesen (born Hans Peter Arnesen, 25 August 1945, Salzburg, Austria) – keyboards (1973–1974)
Tony Thorpe (born Anthony John Thorpe, 20 July 1945, St Bartholomew Hospital, Smithfield, London) – guitars, vocals (1974–1979)
Bob Benham – guitars, vocals (1979)
Alex Bines – drums, vocals (1982–1999)
Steve Kinch – bass, vocals (1987–1991)
Trevor Holliday – bass, vocals (1991–1993)

The Rubettes featuring Bill Hurd (2000–present)
Alex Bines – drums, vocals (2000–2013)
Rufus Ruffell – guitars, vocals (2000–2009)
Ian Pearce – guitars, vocals (2009–2013)
Paul Da Vinci – vocals (2000–2006)
George Bird – vocals (2006–2013)
Paul Callaby – drums, vocals (2013–2014)
Ray Frost – guitars, vocals (2013–2014)
John Sorrell – bass, vocals (2013–2014)
Yvan Silva – guitars, vocals (2013–2014)
Mike Steed – bass, vocals (2014)
Billy Hill - bass, vocals (2000-2013, 2017-2020)
Martin Clapson – drums, vocals (2015-2017, 2018-2020)
Kenny Butler – guitars, vocals – deceased (2014-2018)

The Rubettes featuring Alan Williams (2000–2019)
Alan Williams – guitars, vocals (1974–1980, 1982–1999, 2000–present)
John Richardson – drums, vocals (1973–1980, 2000–2019)
Mick Clarke – bass, vocals (1974–1980, 1982–1987, 1993–1999, 2000–2019)
Steve Etherington – keyboards, guitars, vocals (2015–2019)
Mark Haley – keyboards, guitars, vocals (2000–2015)

The Rubettes featuring Alan Williams (2019–present)
Alan Williams – guitars, vocals (1974–1980, 1982–1999, 2000–present)
Mark Haley – keyboards, vocals (2000–2015, 2019–present)
Glyn Davies – guitar, vocals (2019–present)
Lawrie Haley – bass, vocals (2019–present)
Spencer Lingwood – drums, vocals (2019–present)

Discography

Studio albums

Other Albums
On Tour (October 2008) [Studio Album/Compilation + Bonus Tracks] CLCD002 
La Legende Continue (July 2016) [Studio Album/Compilation + Bonus Tracks] CLCD003

Singles

See also
List of artists who reached number one on the UK Singles Chart
List of 1970s one-hit wonders in the United States
List of performers on Top of the Pops

References

External links
Rubettes featuring Alan Williams
The Rubettes featuring Bill Hurd 
Tony Thorpe Official Website

[ The Rubettes biography at the AllMusic website]
John Richardson biography 
Lancashiretelegraph.co.uk

English rock music groups
English pop music groups
English glam rock groups
Musical groups established in 1973